Jaroudi Media is a Lebanese record label founded by the Businessman Youssef Jaroudi. The company was founded in late 2011.

Known Artists 

 Nancy Nasrallah  
 Georges Al Rassi
 Michel Azzi
 Kamil Chamoun

See also 
 List of record labels

References

External links
  official website

Arab record labels
Record labels established in 2011